Miles Alexander "Bobby" Monk (22 October 1885 – 19 January 1937) was an Australian rules footballer who played with Melbourne in the Victorian Football League (VFL).

He later served in France during World War I.

Notes

External links 

1885 births
Australian rules footballers from Victoria (Australia)
Melbourne Football Club players
Australian military personnel of World War I
1937 deaths
People from Mornington Peninsula
Military personnel from Victoria (Australia)